Dariusz Zakrzewski (born 18 June 1961 in Białystok) is a Polish professional road racing cyclist. He was a third place on Tour de Pologne (1985), winner of French race Conseil general de Val D'oisse (1991) where he defeated later world champion, Laurent Brochard. In France he also won Paris-Vaily-Classic and Paris-St. Mouve races.

He was a member of following teams: Ognisko Białystok, Gwardia Katowice, VC Levallois and Corbeil Essonnes. On 25 March 1993 he officially ended his cycling career. Since 2000 Zakrzewski is a second technical director in CCC-Polsat team.

References

1961 births
Living people
Sportspeople from Białystok
Polish male cyclists